Kamehameha Highway is one of the main highways serving suburban and rural O‘ahu in the U.S. state of Hawai‘i. Informally known as Kam Highway, it begins at Nimitz Highway near Pearl Harbor and Hickam Air Force Base in Honolulu, serves the island's older western suburbs, and turns north across the O‘ahu Central Valley to the North Shore. At the North Shore, Kamehameha Highway heads northeast around the northern tip of O‘ahu, then southeast to and just beyond Kāne‘ohe Bay on the windward coast. The road was named after King Kamehameha I.

A short detached segment of the Kamehameha Highway exists for a few blocks in the Honolulu neighborhood of Kalihi. This segment runs as a short extension of Dillingham Boulevard from Pu‘uhale Road (near the O‘ahu Community Correctional Center) to exit 18B on Interstate H-1. This section was contiguous with the rest of the highway before the construction of the H-1 viaduct.

Route description

Route 99 (Honolulu to Hale‘iwa)

As Route 99, Kamehameha Highway begins at its southern terminus at the Pearl Harbor interchange of Interstate H-1 near Pearl Harbor and Hickam Air Force Base. The highway then turns west through the suburbs of ‘Aiea and Pearl City, passing Pearlridge Center, the state's second largest shopping mall.

After passing Pearl City and the interchange with Interstate H-2 near Waipahu, Route 99 turns north through the central O‘ahu suburbs of Waipi‘o and Mililani.  South of Wahiawā near Wheeler Army Airfield, the named Kamehameha Highway continues through Wahiawā as Route 80, while Route 99 (as Wilikina Drive and Kamananui Road) bypasses Wahiawā on the west, rejoining Kamehameha Highway north of Whitmore Village.  It then continues north through pineapple fields and former sugar cane fields to the junction with Route 83 near Hale‘iwa.

Route 80 (Wahiawā)
As Route 80, Kamehameha Highway begins at the interchange with Interstate H-2 and Route 99 and passes through central Wahiawā and passing Whitmore Village before rejoining Route 99 north of Wahiawā.

Route 83 (Hale‘iwa to Kāne‘ohe)

Originally, Kamehameha Highway continued as Route 83 at the junction with Route 99 at Weed Junction in Hale‘iwa, passing through Hale‘iwa up the North Shore.  Since 1995, Route 83 begins inland from Weed Junction as the Joseph P. Leong Highway and bypasses Hale‘iwa town on the inland side, rejoining Kamehameha Highway north of Hale‘iwa.

From Hale‘iwa, Kamehameha Highway passes Waimea Bay, Sunset Beach, and the Turtle Bay Resort at the northern tip of O‘ahu before heading down the Windward Coast communities of Lā‘ie, Hau‘ula, Punalu‘u, and Ka‘a‘awa.

At Kahalu‘u, Kamehameha Highway follows the coastline through He‘eia and the main commercial district of Kāne‘ohe (this segment was formerly Route 836), while Route 83 continues as Kahekili Highway bypassing Kāne‘ohe town to the west before reaching the junction with Likelike Highway (Route 63).  Route 83 rejoins Kamehameha Highway in Kāne‘ohe and continues south to the interchange with Interstate H-3 and the eastern terminus at Route 61.

Route 830

Its northern terminus is with Route 83, near Kahalu‘u. It then continues southward along the shore of the Kāne‘ohe Bay, until its southern terminus with Routes 63 and 83, only 1.5 miles away from Interstate H-3.

Major intersections

See also

List of Hawaii state highways

References

Roads in Hawaii
Transportation in Honolulu County, Hawaii